Travis Charlton Bowyer (born August 3, 1981) is an American former professional baseball relief pitcher. He played for the Minnesota Twins of Major League Baseball in 2005.

Career
On June 2, Bowyer was drafted out of high school by the Minnesota Twins in the 20th round of the 1999 Major League Baseball Draft. He was traded on December 2, 2005, along with Scott Tyler to the Marlins for Luis Castillo. The Marlins intended to use Bowyer in the bullpen, but due to injury, Bowyer has not pitched since the trade.

In early , Florida Marlins GM Larry Beinfest stated his belief that Bowyer was still a future closer. However, in March, Bowyer was released and re-signed to a minor league deal. He then missed all of 2007 after undergoing shoulder surgery in August 2006. After being out of baseball for seven years, he played in 2012 with the Somerset Patriots of the Atlantic League of Professional Baseball.

Awards and honors
 2005 - International League All-Star RP
 Participated in the 2005 Futures Game during All-Star Weekend

References

External links

Pelota Binaria (Venezuelan Winter League)

1981 births
Living people
Baseball players from Virginia
Cardenales de Lara players
American expatriate baseball players in Venezuela
Elizabethton Twins players
Fort Myers Miracle players
Grand Canyon Rafters players
Gulf Coast Twins players
Major League Baseball pitchers
Minnesota Twins players
New Britain Rock Cats players
Sportspeople from Lynchburg, Virginia
Quad Cities River Bandits players
Rochester Red Wings players
Somerset Patriots players